The 2009–10 TVL Premier League or 2009–10 Port Vila Premier League is the 16th season of the Port Vila Premier League top division.

The top five of the league qualify for the 2010 VFF National Super League.

Amicale FC were champions and Seveners United and Westtan Broncos FC relegated to the 2010–11 TVL First Division.

Teams 
 Amicale FC
 Seveners United
 Spirit 08
 Tafea FC
 Teouma Academy
 Tupuji Imere
 Westtan Broncos
 Yatel FC

Standings

References

External links
 

Port Vila Football League seasons
2009–10 in Vanuatuan football
Port
Port